This is a list of living former members of the New Zealand House of Representatives (the unicameral house of the New Zealand Parliament) who were elected more than 40 years ago. The most recent election to occur more than 40 years ago took place on 28 November 1981 ( days ago) to determine the composition of the 40th New Zealand Parliament. There were no by-elections during the terms of the 40th Parliament.

See also
 List of longest-serving members of the New Zealand Parliament

Notes

Citations

 elected earliest
Parliament